Elisha Phelps (November 16, 1779 – April 6, 1847) was a United States representative from Connecticut. He was the son of Noah Phelps and father of John Smith Phelps who was a United States Representative from Missouri. He was born in Simsbury, Connecticut. In 1800, he was graduated from Yale College and from Litchfield Law School. He was admitted to the bar in 1803 and began practice in Simsbury.

Phelps was member of the Connecticut House of Representatives in 1807, 1812, and 1814-1818. He was elected as a Toleration Republican to the Sixteenth Congress (March 4, 1819 – March 3, 1821). He was again a member of the Connecticut House of Representatives in 1821 and served as speaker. He served in the Connecticut Senate 1822-1824 and was elected as an Adams candidate to the Nineteenth and Twentieth Congresses (March 4, 1825 – March 3, 1829). He declined to be a candidate for renomination in 1828. After leaving Congress, he was Connecticut comptroller 1831-1837 and again a member of the Connecticut House of Representatives in 1829 and 1835 and served as speaker in 1829. He was appointed a commissioner to revise and codify the state laws in 1835.

In 1838 and 1839, Phelps ran under a Conservative banner for Governor of Connecticut. His attempts were unsuccessful.

Phelps died in Simsbury in 1847 and was buried in Hop Meadow Cemetery.

His home, which he built in 1820, has been renamed the Amos Eno House, after a subsequent owner.  It still stands in Simsbury and is on the National Register of Historic Places.

References

Speakers of the Connecticut House of Representatives
1779 births
1847 deaths
Litchfield Law School alumni
Yale College alumni
Democratic-Republican Party members of the United States House of Representatives from Connecticut
Connecticut National Republicans
19th-century American politicians
National Republican Party members of the United States House of Representatives